Deqing railway station is a railway station in Deqing County, Huzhou, Zhejiang, China. It opened on 1 July 2013 with the Nanjing–Hangzhou high-speed railway. It is also served by Shangqiu–Hangzhou high-speed railway (Huzhou–Hangzhou section).

Other stations in Deqing County
It is one of two railway stations in Deqing County, the other being Deqing East on the Xuancheng–Hangzhou railway.

References 

Railway stations in Zhejiang
Railway stations in China opened in 2013